Crowsnest Range is a mountain range of the Rocky Mountains in southwestern Alberta and southeastern British Columbia, Canada.

The range is located south of the Crowsnest Pass, which separates it from the High Rock Range. It is part of the Southern Continental Ranges of the Canadian Rockies. Sub-ranges include, from north to south, Lizard Range, Taylor Range, Flathead Range and Blairmore Range.

Peaks and Mountains
Mount Ptolemy - 
Crowsnest Mountain - 
Seven Sisters Mountain -

See also
 Ranges of the Canadian Rockies

References

Ranges of the Canadian Rockies
Mountain ranges of Alberta
Mountain ranges of British Columbia
Elk Valley (British Columbia)